Johan Carbonero (born 20 July 1999) is a Colombian football player who plays as winger for Argentine Primera División club Racing Club.

References

External links

1999 births
Living people
Colombian footballers
Colombian expatriate footballers
Sportspeople from Cauca Department
Colombia under-20 international footballers
Association football wingers
Once Caldas footballers
Club de Gimnasia y Esgrima La Plata footballers
Racing Club de Avellaneda footballers
Categoría Primera A players
Argentine Primera División players
Colombian expatriate sportspeople in Argentina
Expatriate footballers in Argentina